Gweta is a small village in Botswana.

Generally considered the gateway to the Makgadikgadi Pans. Gweta derived its name from the sound of croaking bullfrogs which bury themselves in the sand until the rainy season arrives and they emerge to mate.

The huge expanse of the Makgadikgadi Pans is bigger than Switzerland. Once a large river-fed lake, the Makgadikgadi Pans now lie saline and empty. The pans are littered with stone tools and artefacts dated from between 2,000 and 500,000 years old. During the wet season 35–75,000 zebra and wildebeest migrate into the area with regular sightings of lion, cheetah and other predators who follow in their wake. The zebra and wildebeest migration across the pans is southern Africa's last surviving zebra and wildebeest migration and the second largest in the world. Hundreds of thousands of flamingo also appear to feed as long as the water lasts. The pans are also a permanent haven for desert species such as the meerkat and the elusive brown hyaena, the third rarest carnivore in the world.

In the area around Gweta are national monuments in the form of baobabs. Greens Baobab, 27 km south of Gweta was inscribed by the 19th-century hunters and traders Frederick Thomas Green and Hendrik Matthys van Zyl as well as other ruthless characters.

About 11 km further south of Green's Baobab is the turn-off to the far more impressive Chapman's Baobab, which has a circumference of 25m and was historically used as a navigation beacon. It was also used as an early post office by passing explorers, traders and travellers, many of whom left inscriptions on its trunk. On the 7th of January 2016, Chapman's Baobab fell.
It is not as yet clear what caused Chapman's to fall, or whether the tree is still alive.

See also
 Mathangwane Village

Villages in Botswana